Jacomo Barbarigo was a Venetian commentator and also the provveditore of Morea. During the 15th century, he wrote a series of dispatches pertaining to the military events that transpired in the Peloponnesus. These letters were written between 1465 and 1466.

Italian journalists
Italian male journalists
15th-century Venetian writers
Jacomo